La Vie Electronique is a series of 3-disc CD releases by Klaus Schulze, reissuing material from his limited edition 50-disc CD box set The Ultimate Edition (2000), which itself collected the previously released limited edition multi-disc box sets Silver Edition (1993, 10 discs), Historic Edition (1995, 10 discs), and Jubilee Edition (1997, 25 discs), along with an additional 5 discs. The series began in 2009 with a plan to release all the music from The Ultimate Edition in chronological order. Four volumes were released in 2009, and four more were released in 2010. The next two volumes were released in 2011, with the next two following in 2012. The thirteenth volume was released in 2013, and the fourteenth and fifteenth volumes in 2014. The sixteenth and final volume, containing five CDs rather than the usual three, was released on May 29, 2015.

One noticeable difference between the original box sets and the La Vie Electronique issues is the indexing of the discs themselves. While the individual movements of longer pieces were indicated in the sleeve notes of the box sets, those compositions were presented as one continuous track. On the LVE editions, separate track indexing points are given to each of these sections.

Four tracks from the original box editions are not present within the La Vie Electronique series - two from The Ultimate Edition ("Ballet pour le Docteur Faustus" and "Discover Trakl") and two from the Jubilee Edition ("The Unspoken Thing" and "Ludwigs Traum"). The latter two selections were also not repeated in the Ultimate Edition set, though both are in fact variations of "Ballet pour Le Docteur Faustus". Similarly, "Discover Trakl" is an extended version of the track "George Trakl" from the 1978 album X, and this longer version (in a slightly edited form) was included in place of the original on that album's 2005 reissue.

La Vie Electronique 1

Disc 1

Disc 2

Disc 3

La Vie Electronique 2

Disc 1

Disc 2

Disc 3

La Vie Electronique 3

Disc 1

Disc 2

Disc 3

La Vie Electronique 4

Disc 1

Disc 2

Disc 3

La Vie Electronique 5

Disc 1

Disc 2

Disc 3

La Vie Electronique 6

Disc 1

Disc 2

Disc 3

La Vie Electronique 7

Disc 1

Disc 2

Disc 3

La Vie Electronique 8

Disc 1

Disc 2

Disc 3

La Vie Electronique 9

Disc 1

Disc 2

Disc 3

La Vie Electronique 10

Disc 1

Disc 2

Disc 3

La Vie Electronique 11

Disc 1

Disc 2

Disc 3

La Vie Electronique 12

Disc 1

Disc 2

Disc 3

La Vie Electronique 13

Disc 1

Disc 2

Disc 3

La Vie Electronique 14

Disc 1

Disc 2

Disc 3

La Vie Electronique 15

Disc 1

Disc 2

Disc 3

La Vie Electronique 16

Disc 1

Disc 2

Disc 3

Disc 4

Disc 5

References

External links
 Klaus Schulze home page

Klaus Schulze albums